Evangelia Sotiriou (born March 2, 1980, Athens) is a Greek rhythmic gymnast.

Sotiriou competed for Greece in the rhythmic gymnastics individual all-around competition at the 1996 Summer Olympics in Atlanta. There, she was 26th in the qualification round and didn't advance to the semifinal.

References

External links 
 
 

1980 births
Living people
Greek rhythmic gymnasts
Gymnasts at the 1996 Summer Olympics
Olympic gymnasts of Greece
Gymnasts from Athens